Pseudastylopsis squamosus is a species of beetle in the family Cerambycidae. It was described by Chemsak and Linsley in 1986.

References

Acanthocinini
Beetles described in 1986